Ak Chin, is a rural native village and a census-designated place on the Tohono Oʼodham Reservation, in Pima County, Arizona, United States. It had a population of 30 as of the 2010 U.S. Census and an estimated population of 31 as of July 1, 2015.

It is not to be confused with either Ak-Chin Village or with Ak Chin, a populated place located within Ak-Chin Village.

Demographics

Ak-Chin first appeared on the 2010 U.S. Census as a census-designated place (CDP).

References

Census-designated places in Pima County, Arizona
Populated places in Pima County, Arizona
Arizona placenames of Native American origin
Tohono O'odham Nation